Haulani  is an impact crater located on Ceres that contains "Spot 1", one of the bright spots observed by the Dawn spacecraft. The crater was named after Haulani, the Hawaiian goddess of plants. In July 2018, NASA released a comparison of physical features, including Haulani crater, found on Ceres with similar ones present on Earth.

Haulani is one of the youngest craters on Ceres, estimated to have been formed between 1.7 and 5.9 Myr (million years) ago, and as such has numerous unique geological features, with much evidence of tectonic activity. The crater is internally divided between its east, which lies on a raised plateau, and its west, which is of a low altitude.

See also
List of geological features on Ceres

References

Impact craters on asteroids
Surface features of Ceres